Chil Konar (also Romanized as Chīl Konār; also known as Chehel Konār) is a village in Dalgan Rural District, in the Central District of Dalgan County, Sistan and Baluchestan Province, Iran. At the 2006 census, its population was 754, in 130 families.

References 

Populated places in Dalgan County